John Alfray (fl. 1391) was an English politician.

Family
Alfray's father, John Alfray, was MP for East Grinstead in the 1360s and his son, John, also represented the town.

Career
He was a Member (MP) of the Parliament of England for East Grinstead in 1391.

References

14th-century births
Year of death missing
English MPs 1391